Henry Brouncker (c. 1550 – 3 June 1607), of Erlestoke, Wiltshire and West Ham, Essex, was an English politician whose later career was spent in Ireland.

He was born in Wiltshire, a younger son of Henry Brouncker of Melksham and Erlestoke and his second wife Ursula Yate.

He was a Member (MP) of the Parliament of England for Westbury in 1572, for Devizes in 1584, 1586 and 1589, and for Dorchester in 1601. He saw military service in Ireland, and went on a diplomatic mission to Scotland in 1601, where he was well received, being described as a man who was "true and wise". He was knighted in 1597. After the accession of  King James I, he was in favour at Court, being listed as one of those who had the right of unrestricted access to the Privy Chamber. He became Lord President of Munster in  1603: he died in that office and was buried in St. Mary's Church, Cork.

By his wife Anne Parker, daughter of Henry Parker, 11th Baron Morley and Lady Elizabeth Stanley, he was the father of William, 1st Viscount Brouncker. Anne died in 1612.

References

1550s births
1607 deaths
Members of the Parliament of England for Dorchester
People from Wiltshire
People from West Ham
English MPs 1572–1583
English MPs 1584–1585
English MPs 1586–1587
English MPs 1589
English MPs 1601
Kingdom of England people in the Kingdom of Ireland